The Flip Wilson Show is an hour-long variety show that originally aired in the US on NBC from September 17, 1970, to June 27, 1974. The show starred American comedian Flip Wilson; the program was one of the first American television programs starring a black person in the title role to become highly successful with a white audience. Specifically, it was the first successful network variety series starring an African American. During its first two seasons, its Nielsen ratings made it the nation's second most watched show.

Overview 

The show consisted of many skits in a 60-minute variety format. It also broke new ground in American television by using a "theatre-in-the-round" stage format, with the audience seated on all sides of a circular performance area (with some seats located behind the sketch sets on occasion).

Wilson was most famous for creating the role of Geraldine Jones, a sassy, modern woman who had a boyfriend named Killer (who, when not in prison, was at the pool hall). Flip also created the role of Reverend Leroy, who was the minister of the Church of What's Happening Now! New parishioners were wary of coming to the church as it was hinted that Reverend Leroy was a con artist. Wilson popularized the catchphrase "The Devil made me do it!".

Geraldine Jones was a huge part of The Flip Wilson Show and was played by Wilson wearing women's clothing. Some of "Geraldine's" most famous quotes are, "The Devil made me buy this dress!", "Don't you touch me, honey, you don't know me that well! You devil, you!" and "What you see is what you get!"

In addition to the skits, Wilson also signed many popular singers to provide entertainment. African-American singers such as Ella Fitzgerald, James Brown, Louis Armstrong, Lena Horne, Stevie Wonder, The Jackson 5, The Chi-Lites, Ray Charles, Aretha Franklin, Gladys Knight & the Pips, The Pointer Sisters, Charley Pride, Johnny Mathis, The Temptations, and The Supremes appeared on the program, as well as many contemporary white entertainers like Bobby Darin (a frequent guest on his show), Bing Crosby (two appearances), Roy Clark, Joan Rivers, The Osmonds, Johnny Cash, Roger Miller, and Pat Boone. Usually, the singers also chose to partake in skits with Wilson.

Wilson's clout allowed him to get both the new breakout performers (such as The Jackson 5, Roberta Flack, Sandy Duncan, Lily Tomlin, George Carlin, Bill Cosby, Richard Pryor, Albert Brooks, Lola Falana, and Melba Moore, all of whom became very popular during this period) as well as established singers. In late 1971, gospel legend Mahalia Jackson made one of her last public performances on The Flip Wilson Show.

While The Flip Wilson Show first shared a studio with other television series, Wilson's massive popularity allowed for him to get his own set of soundstages, starting in the fall 1972 season. As the seasons went on, however, the show's ratings slipped; ratings across the variety show genre began a terminal decline in the mid-1970s. This, coupled with Wilson's repeated demands for higher raises in his salary, caused the series to go over its budget and led to its cancellation.

Half-hour versions of the series aired on TV Land from 1997 to 2006. From 2011 to 2012, the show aired on TV One. From 2012 to 2016, half-hour versions of the show aired on the Aspire network.  Decades presented a Weekend Binge of the half-hour version on October 8–9, 2022.

Broadcast history and ratings

Reception
The Flip Wilson Show won two Emmy Awards out of 18 nominations. The wins were both in 1971, for Outstanding Variety Series—Musical and Outstanding Writing Achievement in Variety or Music. Wilson won both awards, with producer Bob Henry and executive producer Monte Kay also earning statuettes for the variety series honor and Herbert Baker, Hal Goodman, Larry Klein, Bob Schiller, Bob Weiskopf and Norman Steinberg for their writing.

Other nominations included Outstanding Variety Series in 1972 and 1973; Outstanding Writing Achievement in Variety or Music in 1972 and 1973 (Dick Hills and Sid Green replaced Norman Steinberg in 1972 on the nomination, and Stan Burns, Peter Gallay, Don Hinkley, Mike Marmer and Paul McCauley replaced Hal Goodman, Larry Klein, Bob Schiller and Bob Weiskopf in 1973); Outstanding New Series in 1971; Outstanding Directorial Achievement in Variety or Music in 1971, 1972 and 1973, all for Tim Kiley; Outstanding Achievement in Live or Tape Sound Mixing in 1971 and 1972 for Dave Williams; Outstanding Achievement in Art Direction or Scenic Direction in 1971, 1972 and 1973 for Romain Johnston; Outstanding Single Program – Variety or Musical in 1972; Outstanding Achievement in Lighting Direction in 1972 for John Nance; and Outstanding Achievement in Technical Direction in 1972 for technical director Louis Fusari and cameramen Ray Figelski, Rich Lombardo, Jon Olson and Wayne Osterhoudt.

Flip Wilson won one Golden Globe award in 1971 and received two other nominations in 1972 and 1973 for Best Performance by an Actor in a Television Series – Comedy or Musical. The Flip Wilson Show received an additional Golden Globe nomination in 1972 for Best Television Series—Comedy or Musical.

References

External links

 

1970 American television series debuts
1970s American black television series
1970s American musical comedy television series
1970s American sketch comedy television series
1974 American television series endings
1970s American variety television series
NBC original programming
Peabody Award-winning television programs
Television series by CBS Studios